Swami Shraddhanand College is a part of Delhi University established in 1967, run under the trusteeship of the Delhi government. Named after Arya Samaj educationist, Swami Shraddhanand, the college is in Alipur, in North West Delhi. It is equipped with qualified teaching staff specialized laboratories and adequate library facilities.

In 2006, the college came made news for appointing four differently abled teachers. Swami Shrdhanand  College started at Gandhi Asram Narela in 1967, and 93 biga Land give to Swami Shraddhanand College  Management Committee at Singhu Border by Pradhan Sh.Sunder lal khatri (Bankner)Free of Cost account  of Gram Sabha Land Mamurpur Narela  Delhi 110040.Swami Shardhanand College comes under North campus of University of Delhi

Courses offered
 B.Sc. (hons) chemistry
 B.A. (Hons) Geography
 B.A. (Hons) Hindi
 B.A. (Hons) History
 B.Com (Hons) 
 B.Sc. (Hons) Botany
 B.com (Prog.)
 B.Sc. (Hons) Microbiology
 B.Sc. (Hons) Physics
 B.Sc. (Hons) Zoology
 B.Sc. Applied Life Sciences with Agro-Chemical and Pest Control
 B.Sc. Life Sciences
 B.Sc. Physical Sciences 
 M.A Hindi
 B.A. English (Hons) 
B.A. (Prog.)

References

External links
Official website
 University of Delhi

Delhi University
North West Delhi district
1967 establishments in Delhi
Educational institutions established in 1967